Naomh Fionnbarra GAA is a Gaelic Athletic Association club in based in Cabra, in the north city area of Dublin.

The club has adult football, hurling and camogie teams.

The Naomh Fionnbarra Hurling Football Comogie club was founded in 1945. The club has been synonymous with Gaelic Games and Irish culture for 65 years in the Cabra Area. The club was set up to promote and develop the Irish culture, language, and heritage through the medium of the GAA.  The Primary founders of the club were Jack Casserly, Joe Brady, Ned Wolahan, and Bill Bracken.

The men started by running Roads League for juveniles and later on, they entered the Dublin Juvenile Leagues. The club was the first parish in Dublin to run road leagues which are still being run today. In 1946 the under-14 team reached the hurling final in the '15 Acres' but did not win.

The following year the first trophies were won which were an under-15 hurling league and an under-16 football league. In the early forties, men like Jack Casserly used to sell raffle tickets around the doors for firewood to raise money for the young club.

As the club grew, Seamus Nolan became involved and the club entered a Junior Hurling Team. Seamus was a Waterford man who was one of the first residents on Bannow Road, and the club used his house all through the fifties to hold their meetings. In 1952 the club won the junior D league, in1953 the junior C League, Smith Cup, and in 1954 they won the Miller Shield.

In the year 1958 the club won the B league in hurling. In 1950 Gerry Kehoe (sn) joined the club and worked to get juvenile teams together.  Kehoe was an experienced athlete having won a Wicklow minor medal and an All Ireland junior football medal in 1938 with London.

Kehoe worked over many decades, holding all positions in the club both on and off the pitch, promoting and building the club at every level until his death at the age of 69 in 1980.

Larry Kearns joined Gerry Kehoe and together in the late fifties and early sixties, their juveniles teams won two under-15 Hurling Leagues, 16 Hurling league and Minor Hurling and Football leagues. 

St Finbarr's School has played a big part in the continual supply of players for the club as far back as 1943, when the school teams became the first primary school to win the hurling and football in the same year. In 1958 the club started a Camogie section and this was run by Jim Byrne and his wife Maureen Byrne. They won an Intermediate Championship in 1958.

The club was considered to be more focused on hurling than football.  However, the junior footballers won the Junior Championship and Junior A League in 1961. The team won a football Championship in 1962 and the Camogie section lasted up until 1968.

Under the management of Joe Brady, John Myles, and Ned Wolahan, the team beat St Vincent in Parnell Park. This was the start of what would be called the "Golden Decade" as the club won a number of championships and leagues to go both senior hurling and football in a 12-year period. In 1966 the football team won their way into senior ranks by winning the inter-football Championship.

The Junior Hurlers in 1965 won the junior hurling league and championship. In 1968 the under-13 footballers lost in the A-league final. In 1969 they won the double in inter-championship and league.

The Hurlers won the senior hurling league in 1970 and 1971. In the 73, 74, and 75 seasons the club team won a number of juvenile leagues in under-12, 13 and 14 but lost senior football status in 1976.

At this point, older club members like Gerry Kehoe, Seamus Nolan, Nancy Keogh and John Myles (sn) a number of younger members took more interest in the workings of the club and its teams. Others involved included Mick Brown, Timmy Mullane, Phil Lynch, Joe Glynn, Madaline Kehoe, Paddy Keogh, Joe Casserly, Willy McAuley, Sean Myles (sn), Hughie Flanagan, Gerry Kehoe (jn), Mary Myles, Johnnie Smithers, Nicky Kehoe, and Mick Hopkins.

In 1961 a development committee was set up to gain the club its own clubhouse, with Gerry Kehoe (sn), Donal Massey, and Paddy Dillon as club chairman. The club was offered a piece of land behind the church on Killkearnan Road, but did not have the necessary funds to develop. In 1974 the club committee approached the city council to build a clubhouse on the site of Bogies that now houses the community centre, but were refused.

In 1978 Gerry Kehoe (sn) was the club's representative on the old Cabra community council and the issue of Charleville House came up on the agenda. It was proposed to knock it down as both the Legion of Mary and the Pigeon Club had been using it, and due to vandalism, the building had been abandoned.

Gerry Kehoe proposed to the council that the club would take over the abandoned building. This was put to the club executive who gave the permission which led  the building to be the club's premises for the next 16 years. 

The year 1983 would go down as one of the most successful years in the club's history, when the hurlers won the league, Championship and Doyle cup in a two-month period. The team was managed by Philly Lynch, Timmy Mullane and Phelim Brady. In 1984, the footballers having won the city inter-league lost out in a playoff with St Anne’s by a point to go to the final to go senior. In 1983 the club formed a Camogie team for the second time.

Jackie McKeogh was among a number of the women put in a junior Camogie team which resulted in a Camogie section being set up in 1985. Jackie McKeogh, Eilish Langan, Eileen Farrell, Orla Langan, and Kim McKeogh were all involved in getting this section up and running.

At this time, a number of young people became involved in running the teams and working on the committees. Joe Lyons, Tommy Mc Donagh, Peter Fizgearld, Mick Ward, Ray O’Reilly, Shane McGill, Vincent Kehoe, Declan Fagan, Kenneth Broughan, Paul McManus, Hugh Flanagan, Seamus Kehoe, Paul Turner, Stephen Morgan, John Morgan (jn), Tomo Kelly, Jimmy Fagan, Robert Brady, Paul Farrell, Thomas ‘Big Mac’ Mc Donald, Anto Keogh (snr), Tony Smith, Terry McKeogh and Anthony 'Gossey' Costello.

On the playing fields the senior hurlers in 1985 reached the quarter-final of the senior hurling championship, losing out by two points to Eoghan Ruadh who reached the final. The intermediate football team won the Stephens cup in 1984 and a number of the juveniles teams won leagues.

In early 1980 a major fundraiser was started to get money to build a new club house. Fred Turner (Sn) with a number of club members organized this massive fundraising effort which was supported well by the people of Cabra.

Another source of fundraising was program selling outside Croke Park. This was started in the late fifties when Seamus Nolan got the club into Croke Park to sell the programs on big match days. With Joe Casserly (JN) and Gerry Kehoe (sn) setting the foundation, it remains a great fundraiser for the club and the children who sell it.

In this period Frank O Neill, Dinny Vavosure, and Paddy Kelly ‘The Saint’ put in a lot of work in at committee and team management.

In 1993 the senior hurlers won the senior hurling league and the junior football team won the Mooney Cup under the management of Paul Farrell. The Senior Hurling selectors were Joe Moran, Joe Lyons and Tommy McDonagh.

In 1992 the club submitted plans for a new clubhouse at the site at Charleville house but the council refused it. At that time two officials, Grace McGuire and Tom Mitchell, of the corporation were very sympathetic to the club's position on a new clubhouse.

They offered the club the playground site on Faussagh Avenue which had been lying idle for a number of years. The club had a general meeting and the members agreed to the move. The club drew up plans for the site with three members putting their houses up for collateral to allow the club to borrow 200,000 Irish pounds.

With further money raised from big draws the club ran, work began on the new clubhouse. The three members who put up their house were Joe Casserly (jn), Eilish Langan and Timmy Mullane. 

The club and the area will always be grateful for their faith and action. The new clubhouse was opened in 1995 and is the heart of the community in Cabra. Five years later the club built a new gym complex with a weight room, sauna, squash court, gym hall and changing rooms.

Within a year the club installed an all-weather pitch when the City Council gave the club the remainder of the old playground.

On the playing pitch over the last 15 years the club has gone from strength to strength. In football the club regained senior status by winning the Intermediate Championship in 2000.

Within five years they had reached two championship finals and were joint winners of the league twice losing out in two playoffs. The selectors were Nicky Kehoe, Sean Kehoe and John Smithers (Sn).

In 2000 the minor hurlers won their first ever Minor championship when they captured the minor B hurling championship by beating Na Fianna on a scoreline of 0-9 to 0-8. The minor team also won the Division 3 hurling title and Division 5 football title as well as the cup. The manager was Robbie McCarthy (sn) with selectors Jim O’Donnell, James Whelan and club coach Paul McManus. 

In 2001 the junior football team won the league under the selectors of Paul Farrell, Gerry Kehoe (jn) and Harry Byrne. In 2007 the Intermediate team won the league under the management of Peter Fitzgerald, Mick Ward, Ray O’Reilly and Ciaran Stone.

In 2001 the under-14 won the division 2 Féile and won division 7 in 2003. The mentors were Ronnie O Brian, Joe Glynn, Linda Lyons, Paul McManus and Paddy Whelan (Sn). Noel Paget, Dermot Smithers, Tony Smithers and Sean Kehoe were the managers of the division 7 team.

In 1998 the under-12 Comogie team won the A Championship and in 2002 the club won the A Championship again at under 12 level. The mentors were Madeline Paget, Vincent Kehoe, Karl Homes and John Brown.

In the adult section of Comogie, the team won the Junior B Championship in 1998 under the selectors of Joyce Carroll and Dessie Pool, and won the Junior A championship in 2001 under selectors Beatrice Casserly and Lee McKeogh. They followed this up by winning the intermediate league and championship double in 2005 to go Senior under the management of Derek Sweetman, Catherine Kirby and Timmy Mullane. 

In 2008 the Senior Hurling team got promoted to Senior League Division 1. 

In 2009 they won the intermediate championship and reached the Leinster GAA Hurling Club Championship final. They were managed by Joe Brady, Joe Moran, Willy McAuley, Martin Costelo, Nicky Kehoe and John Byrne.

In 2010 the intermediate football team won the league. Under the management team of Joe Lyons, Liam Keating, Derek Sweetman and Ray O’Reilly. 

In 2011 the club won its first ever Senior Hurling B championship by beating St Patrick’s of Palmerstown by a point. The final scoreline was 1-19 to 3-12 under the tutelage of Clare native Dave Fogarty. His backroom team was Joe Brady, Joe Moran, Nial Brady and Paddy Travers (sn).

In 2012 the club captured the under-21 B hurling championship after beating St Brigid's under the management team of Nial Brady and Seamus McGrattan. 

In 2013 the club won its first-ever Minor Football B championship by beating Trinty Gaels under the management team of Joe Lyons, Ian McDonnell, Anthony Costello (jn) Derek Sweetman (jn) and Gerard O’Reilly. 

In 2014 the senior hurlers won promotion back to the Division 1 ranks after a playoff win against Crumlin after extra time in Bray Emmets. 

In 2016 the club won its first-ever senior hurling league and championship double when it captured the Senior 2 league title and second Senior B Hurling championship within the space of a month. They beat Naomh Barrog in the championship final on a scoreline of 1-16 to 2-10. The manager was Nial Brady with selectors Lee McKeogh, Shane Langan, Seamus McGrattan, Sue Keogh, Joe Brady, and Joe Moran.  The team was coached by Tipperary native Richie Horgan. 

In 2018 the intermediate Camogie team won the Intermediate 2 Camogie Championship after a 2-7 to 1-9 win over Naomh Olaf. The manager was Thomas Gleeson with Timmie Mullane and Johnny Browne as selectors and Donal Ryan as coach. 

In 2020 the COVID-19 pandemic cancelled all league games. The county board decided that only championships would go ahead this season. The Senior hurlers captured their third Senior B championship in 10 years by beating Cuala B on a scoreline of 2-14 to 0-17. This was followed six days later by the Intermediate footballers who won their first championship at that level since 2000, when they beat Naomh Barrog on a scoreline of 3-10 to 2-11. The senior hurlers were managed by Nial Brady with a backroom team consisting of Brendan Quinn, Shane Langan, Sue Keogh and Declan Fagan with Thomas Gleeson as coach. The intermediate footballers were managed by Keith Russell with a backroom team of Ian McDonnell, Gerard O’Reilly, Johnny Morgan (jn), Paddy Quinn and Cian Hall Quinn with Chris Moore as coach. 

In 1996 a small Irish language crèche was started by Elish Langan and Ellen Farrell, which resulted in 250 pupils attending this school in 2010.

Roll of Honour
Miller Shield 1954.

Under 15 Hurling League Winners D2 1958.

Under 15 Hurling League Winner D1 1959.

Under 16 Hurling League Winner D2 1959.

Minor Hurling League D2 Winner 1960.

Minor Football League D2 Winner 1961.

Junior B Camogie championship winners 1998

Junior A Camogie Championship winners 2001

Inter Camogie league 1958,2005

Inter Camogie Championship  1958 
2005

Intermediate 2 Camogie championship 2018

Senior Camogie shield winners 2006

Ladies Football Championship 2007.

Inter Hurling League (2) 1967,1983.
 Dublin Intermediate Football Championship Winners (3) 1966, 2000, 2020
 Dublin Junior Football Championship Winners (1) 1961
 Dublin Minor B Football Championship Winners 2013
 Dublin AFL Divisions 3 - 12B#AFL Division 3|Dublin Intermediate football league  Winners 2007, 2010,
 Dublin AFL Divisions 3 - 12B#AFL Division 7|Dublin junior 5 Winner 2001. 

Dublin junior football 7 winners 2011
      Senor Hurling League D2 winners(4) 1969,1972,1992,2016,
 Dublin Senior B Hurling Championship:(3) Winners 2011, 2016,2020
 Dublin Intermediate Hurling Championship:(3) Winners 1969, 1983, 2009
 Dublin Junior Hurling Championship: Winners 1965
  Dublin Minor B Hurling Championship Winners 2000
Minor football D 5 winners 2000
Minor hurling D 3 winners 2000

Notable players
John Casserly - Sean Moyles - Paddy Moyles - Phelim Brady - Kevin Crooks*- Mick Brown - Paddy Keogh - Sean Kehoe - Anto Costello - Derek Mc Mullen - Stephen Costello - Eamon Dillon - Siobhan Kehoe - Paul Turner (Sn)- Ray O’Reilly -

References

External links
Official Club Website

Gaelic games clubs in Dublin (city)
Gaelic football clubs in Dublin (city)
Hurling clubs in Dublin (city)
Camogie clubs in County Dublin